Alloclasite is a sulfosalt mineral (IMA symbol: Acl). It is a member of the arsenopyrite group. Alloclasite crystallizes in the monoclinic system and typically forms as columnar to radiating acicular prismatic clusters. It is an opaque steel-gray to silver-white, with a metallic luster and a black streak. It is brittle with perfect cleavage, a Mohs hardness of 5 and a specific gravity of 5.91–5.95.

It was first described in 1866 for an occurrence in Romania. Its name is derived from Greek for "other" and "to break," in reference to its distinct cleavage which distinguished it from the similar appearing mineral marcasite.

The mineral is monoclinic in the P21 space group.

References 

Cobalt minerals
Iron minerals
Sulfosalt minerals
Monoclinic minerals
Minerals in space group 4